National Road 21 is a national road of Cambodia. It connects Phnom Penh to An Phu District in Vietnam. It runs along the bank of the Bassac River.

Further reading

Roads in Cambodia